Ceratophyllus diffinis is a species of flea in the family Ceratophyllidae. It was described by Karl Jordan in 1925.

References 

Ceratophyllidae
Insects described in 1925